Louis, Duke of Brittany (8 January 1707 – 8 March 1712) was the second son of Louis of France, Duke of Burgundy, and Marie Adélaïde of Savoy.

The eldest surviving son of the Dauphin, he was a fils de France. Louis was born at Versailles to the Duke and Duchess of Burgundy. He was created the Duke of Brittany succeeding his late brother Louis, who was the first to hold the title in 200 years. At the time of his birth, Louis was the third-in-line to the throne, following his father and grandfather Louis, le Grand Dauphin. He was preceded in birth by an elder brother, also named Louis, who was born in 1704 and died in infancy the following year.

Due to the deaths of his grandfather in 1711 and his father in 1712, he was heir apparent to his great-grandfather Louis XIV as Dauphin of France for three weeks in 1712. Like his parents, he too died of measles and was buried in the Basilica of St Denis. His younger brother became the Dauphin and eventually succeeded as King Louis XV in 1715.

Ancestry

1707 births
1712 deaths
Deaths from measles
Heirs apparent who never acceded
Princes of France (Bourbon)
People from Versailles
18th-century French people
Dauphins of France
Dukes of Brittany
Burials at the Basilica of Saint-Denis
Royalty and nobility who died as children